Grafton is a town in Worcester County, Massachusetts, United States. The population was 19,664 at the 2020 census. The town consists of the North Grafton, Grafton, and South Grafton geographic areas, each with a separate ZIP Code. Incorporated in 1735, the town is home to a Nipmuc village known as Hassanamisco Reservation, the Willard House and Clock Museum, Community Harvest Project, and the Tufts University Cummings School of Veterinary Medicine. Grafton operates the state's largest on-call fire department, with 74 members.

History
Bands of the Nipmuc tribe are the indigenous inhabitants, and maintain a state-recognized reservation known as Hassanamesit, or Hassanamisco, which was formerly a Praying Indian village from 1647 when the Reverend John Eliot came and converted the Hassanamiscos to Christianity . in 1727 the Hassanamesit reservation of 8,000 acres was divided into 7,500 acres to 40 English proprietors and 500 acres to 7 Nipmuc proprietors. This became Grafton, officially incorporated in 1735.

Grafton stands tall in the industrialization of the Blackstone Valley. Its Northeast Village was once known as "New England Village". The following is an excerpt from the Blackstone Daily about the history of the town:

Grafton has been a significant contributor in the success and progress of the American Industrial Revolution that was started in 1793 by Samuel Slater with his cotton mill in Pawtucket . North Grafton's Upper Mill, now known as the Washington Mills complex, that still produces abrasives, was once known as the New England Manufacturing Company. This was part of the New England Village, as North Grafton was known for generations. This part of the mill was built in 1826 and was part of a much larger complex, but most of that is now gone, mainly due to serious fires. Mill housing was built at 12, 14 and 16 Overlook Street. These central-chimney-style homes were boarding houses with ornate trim that has since been lost.

The town is named for Charles FitzRoy, 2nd Duke of Grafton, a title created for the illegitimate son of King Charles II of England. Ethan Allen ran a gun factory in Grafton in the early 19th century. In the 1930s, a movie, Ah, Wilderness!, was filmed in the town. The moviemakers built a bandstand on the town common, which still stands there today. Grafton Common has many historic homes, churches and buildings and is considered the most quintessential common in the Blackstone Valley. The town is part of the Blackstone River Valley National Heritage Corridor, the oldest industrialized region in the U.S.

North Grafton is the home of the Wyman Gordon Company.  In 1955, the United States Air Force installed a 50,000-ton metal forge in North Grafton as part of its Heavy Press Program in a plant operated by Wyman-Gordon. It was the largest metal forge, and indeed the largest machine, in the world at the time it was built. This forge is used to form strategic metals used in commercial and military aircraft for turbine disks, shafts, and blades, landing struts and other aircraft parts where light weight and extreme strength are needed. The entire undercarriage of the Space Shuttles was forged in Grafton of magnesium.

From 1901 to 1973, North Grafton was home to the Grafton State Hospital. Originally an offshoot of the Worcester State Hospital, Grafton State Hospital served as a "farm colony" where chronically insane patients could live and work in somewhat normal surroundings. The campus was made up of several clusters of buildings and eventually encompassed  in Grafton, Shrewsbury, and Westborough. The hospital was closed in 1973, and the campus, including many of the original buildings, was taken over by the Cummings School of Veterinary Medicine (part of Tufts University) and the Grafton Job Corps center.

One hundred ninety acres of the Hassanamessit Woods, believed to contain the remains of the praying village were under agreement for development for more than 100 homes.  This property has significant cultural importance to the Nipmuc Tribal Nation because it is thought to contain the meetinghouse and the center of the old praying village. However, The Trust for Public Land, the town of Grafton, the Grafton Land Trust, the Nipmuc Nation and the state of Massachusetts intervened.  The Trust for Public Land purchased the property and kept it off the market until 2004, after sufficient funding was procured to permanently protect the property.  The property also has ecological significance as it is adjacent to 187 acres of Grafton owned land as well as 63 acres owned by the Grafton Land Trust.  These properties will provide numerous recreational benefits to the public as well as play a role in protecting the water quality of local watersheds.

Geography
Grafton includes North Grafton, Grafton, and South Grafton, as well as many other industrial revolution era villages due to its long history on the Blackstone River, including Farnumsville, Fisherville, Saundersville and Axtell Corner. The town borders on Shrewsbury, Westborough, Upton, Northbridge, Sutton, Millbury and the city of Worcester.

Demographics

By the 2010 census, the population had reached 17,765.

As of the census of 2000, there were 14,894 people, 5,694 households, and 3,951 families residing in the town. The racial makeup of the town was 95.92% White, 1.25% African American, 0.11% Native American, 1.45% Asian, 0.24% from other races, and 1.03% from two or more races. Hispanic or Latino residents of any race were 1.91% of the population.

There were 5,694 households, out of which 34.1% had children under the age of 18 living with them, 58.1% were married couples living together, 8.5% had a female householder with no husband present, and 30.6% were non-families. 24.6% of all households were made up of individuals, and 8.1% had someone living alone who was 65 years of age or older. The average household size was 2.54 and the average family size was 3.07.

In the town, the population was spread out, with 25.8% under the age of 18, 7.2% from 18 to 24, 33.5% from 25 to 44, 22.3% from 45 to 64, and 11.2% who were 65 years of age or older. The median age was 36 years. For every 100 females, there were 93.5 males. For every 100 females age 18 and over, there were 89.3 males.

The median income for a household in the town was $56,020, and the median income for a family was $66,396. Males had a median income of $48,016 versus $32,347 for females. The per capita income for the town was $26,952. About 2.3% of families and 5.6% of the population were below the poverty line, including 1.6% of those under age 18 and 6.1% of those ages 65 or over.

Government

Transportation

Commuter rail service from Boston's South Station is provided by the MBTA with the Grafton station on its Framingham/Worcester Line.

The Grafton and Upton Railroad currently operates a freight line through the town connecting the Framingham/Worcester Line to the Franklin Line in Milford.
Also, the Worcester Regional Transit Authority has started a shuttle through the town connecting residents to different parts of the town and the Grafton Commuter Rail Station. This shuttle is also connected to the shuttle in one of the neighboring towns, Northbridge.

Boston's Logan International Airport is easily accessible from nearby Framingham. MassPort provides public transportation to all airport terminals from Framingham via the Logan Express bus service seven days per week. The bus terminal and paid parking facility are located on the Shoppers' World Mall property, off the Massachusetts Turnpike Exit 13, between Route 9 and Route 30, at the intersections of East Road and the Burr Street connector.
Worcester Regional Airport, a Primary Commercial (PR) facility with scheduled passenger service, is easily accessible. It has two asphalt runways 5,500 and 6,900 ft (1,700 and 2,100 m) long. Instrument approaches available include precision and non-precision. JetBlue, American Eagle, and Delta all fly into Worcester.

Library

The Grafton Free Public Library opened in 1867. The current building was built in 1927 with money donated by Jerome Wheelock, a local inventor. In the fiscal year 2008, the town of Grafton spent 1.33% ($482,226) of its budget on its public library—some $27 per person.

Education
Grafton is home to six public schools.  Students are separated by whether they live in North or South Grafton until middle school. The school mascot is the Grafton Gators.

 North Grafton Elementary School: grades K–1
 South Grafton Elementary School: grades K–1
 Millbury Street Elementary School: grades 2–6
 North Street Elementary School: grades 2–6
 Grafton Middle School: grades 7–8
 Grafton High School: grades 9–12

Notable people

 Nicholas A. Basbanes, journalist, author and lecturer
 Dave Bayley, music producer and frontman of English band Glass Animals
 Hugh Bradley, Red Sox first baseman who in 1912 hit the first home run at Fenway Park
 Zara Cisco Brough, engineer and Nipmuc Native activist
 Robert Catalanotti, United States Army reserve major general
 Israel Chapin, Revolutionary War general
 Nicholas Gage, journalist, writer and film producer
 George W. Hammond (1833–1908), businessman
 Pearl A. Harwood (1903–1998), librarian and children's book author
 Titus Hutchinson, judge and abolitionist
 Joel Hills Johnson (1802–1883), inventor, Mormon pioneer, published poet and gospel hymn writer, Utah politician, founded the Utah towns of Enoch and Johnson
 Obi Melifonwu, American football safety for the New England Patriots
 Ifeatu Melifonwu, American football cornerback for the Detroit Lions
 Gordon M. Nelson (died 1993), chairman of the Massachusetts Republican State Committee from 1976 to 1980
 Frank O'Hara (1926–1966), avant-garde poet and playwright
 Marc Orrell, former guitarist for the band Dropkick Murphys
 Steve Spagnuolo, former head coach of the St. Louis Rams, currently the defensive coordinator for the Kansas City Chiefs
 Earl Tupper, a NH native, who pioneered Tupperware in Farnumsville, South Grafton, in the 1940s
 Jerome Wheelock, inventor
 John Adams Whipple, pioneer photographer and inventor
 Simon Willard and his brothers, clock makers

See also
 Grafton Public Library (Grafton, Massachusetts)
 Grafton State Hospital
 Grafton (MBTA station)

References

External links

 Grafton official website
 Grafton Public Schools
 Grafton Public Library
 Grafton, Massachusetts History, Photos, and Info
 Grafton News

 
1718 establishments in Massachusetts
Populated places established in 1718
Towns in Massachusetts
Towns in Worcester County, Massachusetts